Blastobacter is a genus of bacteria from the family Nitrobacteraceae. Most of the species originally ascribed to Blastobacter have been transferred to other genera, with Blastobacter henricii as the only remaining valid species. To complicate matters, no type strain is available for Blastobacter henricii, so the entire genus may be dismantled.

References

Further reading

 

Nitrobacteraceae
Bacteria genera
Monotypic bacteria genera